Kuttoor or Kuttur may refer many places in India to:
Karnataka
Kuttur (Kodagu)
Kerala
Kuttur (Thrissur), a town in Thrissur district, Kerala, India
Kuttoor (Thiruvalla), a village in Pathanamthitta district, Kerala, India
Kuttur (Payyanur), a village in Kannur district, Kerala, India